Brentano is an Italian surname. Notable people with the surname include: 

 Antonie Brentano, philanthropist
 August Brentano, bookseller
 Bernard von Brentano, novelist
 Christian Brentano, German writer
 Clemens Brentano, poet and novelist, brother of Bettina von Arnim (born Brentano)
 Franz Brentano, philosopher, influenced phenomenology and gestalt psychology
 Franz Funck-Brentano, French historian and librarian
 Heinrich von Brentano di Tremezzo, politician of the Christian Democratic Union (West Germany)
 Lorenzo Brentano, politician
 Lujo Brentano, economist, reformer
 Marianne Ehrmann-Brentano, novelist
 Robert Brentano, American historian
 Theodore Brentano, American attorney, judge, and first U.S. ambassador to Hungary, son of Lorenzo
 Théophile Funck-Brentano, Luxembourgian-French sociologist

See also
 Brentano's is a bookstore chain owned by Borders Group.
 Brenton